In computing, rpath designates the run-time search path hard-coded in an executable file or library. Dynamic linking loaders use the rpath to find required libraries.

Specifically, it encodes a path to shared libraries into the header of an executable (or another shared library).  This RPATH header value (so named in the Executable and Linkable Format header standards) may either override or supplement the system default dynamic linking search paths.

The rpath of an executable or shared library is an optional entry in the .dynamic section of the ELF executable or shared libraries, with the type DT_RPATH, called the DT_RPATH attribute. It can be stored there at link time by the linker. Tools such as chrpath and patchelf can create or modify the entry later.

Use of the DT_RPATH entry by the dynamic linker 
The different dynamic linkers for ELF implement the use of the DT_RPATH attribute in different ways.

GNU ld.so 
The dynamic linker of the GNU C Library searches for shared libraries in the following locations in order:
 The (colon-separated) paths in the DT_RPATH dynamic section attribute of the binary if present and the DT_RUNPATH attribute does not exist.
 The (colon-separated) paths in the environment variable LD_LIBRARY_PATH, unless the executable is a setuid/setgid binary, in which case it is ignored. LD_LIBRARY_PATH can be overridden by calling the dynamic linker with the option --library-path (e.g. /lib/ld-linux.so.2 --library-path $HOME/mylibs myprogram).
 The (colon-separated) paths in the DT_RUNPATH dynamic section attribute of the binary if present.
 Lookup based on the ldconfig cache file (often located at /etc/ld.so.cache) which contains a compiled list of candidate libraries previously found in the augmented library path (set by /etc/ld.so.conf). If, however, the binary was linked with the -z nodefaultlib linker option, libraries in the default library paths are skipped.
 In the trusted default path /lib, and then /usr/lib. If the binary was linked with the -z nodefaultlib linker option, this step is skipped.

Failing to find the shared library in all these locations will raise the "cannot open shared object file: No such file or directory" error.

Notes:
readelf -d <binary_name> | grep 'R.*PATH' displays the RPATH or RUNPATH of a binary file. In gcc, for instance, one could specify RPATH by -Wl,-rpath,/custom/rpath/.
The option --inhibit-rpath LIST of the dynamic linker instructs it to ignore DT_RPATH and DT_RUNPATH attributes of the object names in LIST. To specify a main program in the LIST, give empty string.
 Libraries specified by the environment variable LD_PRELOAD and then those listed in /etc/ld.so.preload are loaded before the search begins. A preload can thus be used to replace some (or all) of the requested library's normal functionalities, or it can simply be used to supply a library that would otherwise not be found.
 Static libraries are searched and linked into the ELF file at link time and are not searched at run time.

The role of GNU ld 
The GNU Linker (GNU ld) implements a feature which it calls "new-dtags", which can be used to insert an rpath that has lower precedence than the LD_LIBRARY_PATH environment variable.

If the new-dtags feature is enabled in the linker (--enable-new-dtags), GNU ld, besides setting the DT_RPATH attribute, also sets the DT_RUNPATH attribute to the same string. At run time, if the dynamic linker finds a DT_RUNPATH attribute, it ignores the value of the DT_RPATH attribute, with the effect that LD_LIBRARY_PATH is checked first and the paths in the DT_RUNPATH attribute are only searched afterwards.

The ld dynamic linker does not search DT_RUNPATH locations for transitive dependencies, unlike DT_RPATH. 

Instead of specifying the -rpath to the linker, the environment variable LD_RUN_PATH can be set to the same effect.

Solaris ld.so 
The dynamic linker of Solaris, specifically /lib/ld.so of SunOS 5.8 and similar systems looks for libraries in the directories specified in the LD_LIBRARY_PATH variable before looking at the DT_RPATH attribute.  Sun Microsystems was the first to introduce dynamic library loading.  Sun later added the rpath option to ld and used it in essential libraries as an added security feature.  GNU ld did the same to support Sun-style dynamic libraries.

Example 

$ cc -shared -Wl,-soname,termcap.so.4,-rpath,/lib/termcap.so.4 -o termcap.so.4

$ objdump -x termcap.so.4
  NEEDED               libc.so.6
  SONAME               termcap.so.4
  RPATH                /lib/termcap.so.4
In this example, GNU or Sun ld (ld.so) will REFUSE to load termcap for a program needing it unless the file termcap.so is in /lib/ and named termcap.so.4.  is ignored. If /lib/termcap.so.4 is removed to remediate, the shell dies (one cannot load an alternate termcap.so and a rescue disk is needed, but also if a new termcap.so.4 has RPATH /lib, ld.so will refuse to use to load it unless it clobbered /lib/termcap.so.4).  But there's another issue: it isn't safe to copy over some libs in /lib as they are "in use," further restricting the would-be lib tester.  Furthermore,  vs.  means programs needing basic termcap.so are denied because the library above deleted the ABI access to basic support.
$ cc -shared -Wl,-soname,libtermcap.so.2 -o libtermcap.so.2

$ objdump -x termcap.so.2
  NEEDED               libc.so.6
  SONAME               termcap.so.2
A preferred practice is to use "" and have programs check version (all libs do support that) to use features available, but that was often skipped in old releases due to slow computing speed and lack of time to code correctly.

That being said, test this kind of thing thoroughly on a given platform before deciding to rely on it.  Release administrators today are not guaranteed to respect past guidelines or documentation. Some UNIX varieties link and load in a completely different way. rpath is specific to ld shipped with a particular distribution.

Lastly, as said, rpath is a security feature however "mandatory access control" (MAC) and other techniques can be as effective or more effective than rpath to control lib reading and writing.

Control over rpath using today's compilers is often nearly impossible given lengthy and convoluted make(1) scripting. Worse, some build scripts ignore --disable-rpath even though they present it as an option.  It would be time-consuming and frustrating, and probably unfeasible, to fix build scripting in every odd program to compile.

A simple sh(1) "wrapper" can call the real ld, named ld.bin.  The wrapper can filter in/out  option before invoking ld.
  #!/bin/sh
  # - filter ld options here -
  ld.bin $opts

Security considerations 

The use of rpath and also runpath can present security risks where the value applied includes directories under an attacker's control. In particular, this can allow for setUID binaries to be exploited, where an insecure path is used. This can be leveraged to trick the binary into loading malicious libraries from one or other of the directories under an attacker's control.

References

External links 
 chrpath - a tool to change the DT_RPATH attribute of an executable and convert it to an DT_RUNPATH attribute
 FreeBSD devel/chrpath Port - Tool to modify DT_RPATH in existing ELF binaries
 patchELF - a small utility to modify the dynamic linker and DT_RUNPATH attribute of ELF executables.
  - Paper on attacking the run-time linker including attacks on DT_RPATH

Computer libraries
Operating system technology